Omegle is a free online chat website that allows users to socialize with others without the need to register. The service randomly pairs users in one-on-one chat sessions where they chat anonymously using the names "You" and "Stranger" or "Stranger 1" and "Stranger 2" in the case of Spy mode. The site was created by 18-year-old Leif K-Brooks of Brattleboro, Vermont, and was launched on March 25, 2009. Less than a month after launch, Omegle garnered around 150,000 page views a day, and in March 2010 the site introduced a video conferencing feature.

Comparisons have been made to early-1990s AOL.

History
During late 2019 and early 2020, Omegle criticized the Chinese Communist Party, and expressed support for the 2019–20 Hong Kong protests, and added an image of the American Flag on the front page with the words "Xi Jinping (General Secretary of the Communist Party of China) sure looks like Winnie the Pooh" over it.

The initial rules stated that a 13-year-old could use the website with the permission of a parent or guardian. On 6 October 2022, the rules were updated so that only those 18 or older were allowed to use the website.

Controversies
Prior to early 2013, the site did not censor contributions through a profanity filter, and users have reported encountering nudity or sexual content on camera. After January 2013, Omegle implemented a "monitored" video chat, to monitor misbehavior and protect people under the age of 18 from potentially harmful content, including nudity or sexual content. However, the monitoring is not very effective, and users can often skirt around bans. To complement the monitored video chat, Omegle also has an "unmonitored" video chat that is not monitored for sexual content. K-Brooks has acknowledged the questionable content of the site, at one time expressing disappointment at the way in which the site has been used.

Omegle and other random chat websites experienced a surge of popularity due to the COVID-19 pandemic, and an increase of popular YouTube and TikTok social influencers using the website. This has also caused increase of minors using the website. Numerous advisories, bulletins and warnings have been issued by both local and state law enforcement, as there have been major increases in reports of cyber-crime involving sexual exploitation of minors occurring on Omegle due to the popularity surge.

Omegle is currently facing a $22 million lawsuit which was filed in 2019, in regard to a former user of the site who became a victim of child sex exploitation. In 2014, the then 11-year-old plaintiff logged onto Omegle and encountered a Canadian pedophile who blackmailed her into digital sexual slavery. The lawsuit alleges that Omegle knowingly allowed the pairing of minors with pedophiles due to a splash screen warning that stated "Predators have been known to use Omegle, so please be careful". Omegle has since removed this warning from the website.

See also

 Chatroulette
 Stickam

Explanatory notes

References

External links
 

Chat websites
Internet properties established in 2009
Obscenity controversies